Ohinemutu or Ōhinemutu is a suburb in Rotorua, New Zealand. It includes a living Māori village and the original settlement of Rotorua.

Demographics

Kuirau had a population of 1,065 at the 2018 New Zealand census, an increase of 144 people (15.6%) since the 2013 census, and an increase of 138 people (14.9%) since the 2006 census. There were 378 households, comprising 552 males and 516 females, giving a sex ratio of 1.07 males per female. The median age was 33.9 years (compared with 37.4 years nationally), with 210 people (19.7%) aged under 15 years, 261 (24.5%) aged 15 to 29, 462 (43.4%) aged 30 to 64, and 135 (12.7%) aged 65 or older.

Ethnicities were 35.8% European/Pākehā, 62.8% Māori, 6.5% Pacific peoples, 15.5% Asian, and 2.3% other ethnicities. People may identify with more than one ethnicity.

The percentage of people born overseas was 19.4, compared with 27.1% nationally.

Although some people chose not to answer the census's question about religious affiliation, 39.4% had no religion, 38.6% were Christian, 7.0% had Māori religious beliefs, 3.1% were Hindu, 0.6% were Muslim, 0.8% were Buddhist and 3.9% had other religions.

Of those at least 15 years old, 174 (20.4%) people had a bachelor's or higher degree, and 141 (16.5%) people had no formal qualifications. The median income was $20,800, compared with $31,800 nationally. 66 people (7.7%) earned over $70,000 compared to 17.2% nationally. The employment status of those at least 15 was that 357 (41.8%) people were employed full-time, 126 (14.7%) were part-time, and 87 (10.2%) were unemployed.

Marae

The area has four marae:
 Te Kuirau or Utuhina Marae and Te Roro o Te Rangi meeting house is a meeting place of the Ngāti Whakaue hapū of Ngāti te Roro o te Rangi.
 Te Papaiouru Marae and Tamatekapua meeting house  is a meeting place of the Ngāti Whakaue hapū of Ngāti Hurunga Te Rangi, Ngāti Pūkaki, Ngāti Taeotu, Ngāti Te Rangiwaho, Ngāti te Roro o te Rangi and Ngāti Tūnohopū.
 Para te Hoata or Tūnohopū Marae and Tūnohopū meeting house is a meeting place of the Ngāti Whakaue hapū of Ngāti Tūnohopū and Ngāti Whakaue.
 Waikite Marae and Tiki meeting house is a meeting place of the Ngāti Whakaue hapū of Ngāti Whakaue.

Notable people
Merekotia Amohau
Inez Kingi
Henry Taiporutu Te Mapu-o-te-rangi Mitchell

References

Suburbs of Rotorua
Populated places in the Bay of Plenty Region
Populated places on Lake Rotorua